Yang Yang (born 1958) is a Taiwanese-American materials scientist. He is a Professor of Materials Science and Engineering, and Professor of Bioengineering at the University of California, Los Angeles, where he holds the Carol and Lawrence E. Tannas Jr. Endowed Chair in Engineering. Yang is known for his contributions to polymer organic solar cells and lead-halide perovskite solar cells. He was named as one of the "World’s Most Influential Scientific Minds" by Thomson Reuters in 2016. Yang is a fellow of the American Association for the Advancement of Science, American Physical Society, Materials Research Society, Royal Society of Chemistry, and Society of Photo-Optical Instrumentation Engineers.

Early life and education 
Yang was born in 1958 in Taiwan, growing up in the countryside before moving to Taipei with his family at the age of 10. He earned a B.S. in Physics from National Cheng Kung University in 1982. After graduation, he served two years of military service, a mandatory policy for qualified males in Taiwan.

In 1985, Yang moved to the United States to begin graduate studies at the University of Massachusetts, Lowell. During his graduate studies, Yang changed research groups and fields multiple times for personal reasons. Initially Yang worked on studying the nonlinear optical photorefractive effect in barium titanate crystals in the Department of Physics, earning his M.S. in Physics and Applied Physics in 1988. He then continued his graduate studies, using deep-level transient spectroscopy to study charge carrier traps in polycrystalline silicon solar cells in the Department of Electrical Engineering. Yang later transitioned to research on the physical properties of conductive polymers in the Department of Chemistry, earning his Ph.D. in Physics and Applied Physics in 1992 under the supervision of Prof. Jayant Kumar and Prof. Sukant K. Tripathy. Yang's Ph.D. thesis was entitled Photoinduced charge carrier generation and transport in polydiacetylene single crystals.

Career 
After graduating with his Ph.D. in 1992, Yang worked as a researcher at UNIAX Corporation in Santa Barbara, California (now DuPont Display Materials).

Yang began his independent academic career in 1997 as an Assistant Professor of Materials Science and Engineering at the University of California, Los Angeles. He was promoted to Associate Professor in 1998, and full Professor in 2002. In 2010, he was appointed the Carol and Lawrence E. Tannas Jr. Endowed Chair in Engineering.

From 2019 to 2020, Yang served as the founding Dean of the School of Engineering at Westlake University in Hangzhou, China.

Awards and memberships 
Yang is a highly cited researcher, and has been ranked a Highly Cited Researcher by Clarivate/Thomson Reuters since at least 2015. His work has been featured on mainstream news outlets such as NPR, Bloomberg, Time Magazine, USA Today, the LA Times, and the New York Times. Other awards that Yang has received include:
 Sustainable Energy Award of the Royal Society of Chemistry (2019)
Named one of "World’s Most Influential Scientific Minds" by Thomson Reuters (2016)
 Distinguished Alumni Award, National Cheng-Kung University (2016)
 Distinguished Achievement Award, Chinese-American Engineers and Scientists Association of Southern California (2016)

Fellow of the American Association for the Advancement of Science (2019)
 Fellow of the American Physical Society (2015)
 Fellow of the Materials Research Society (2015)
 Fellow of the Royal Society of Chemistry (2014)
 Member of the Society of Photo-Optical Instrumentation Engineers (2014)

References

External links 
Google Scholar / Yang Yang
Autobiographical summary of Yang's research career, published in Matter in 2019
Interview with Advanced Science News in 2020
Video interview with SPIE in 2016 (YouTube link)
Video research talk with SPIE in 2012

1958 births
Living people
Taiwanese academics
UCLA Henry Samueli School of Engineering and Applied Science faculty
Taiwanese emigrants to the United States
University of Massachusetts Lowell alumni
Fellows of the American Physical Society
National Cheng Kung University alumni